The following are the association football events of the year 1901 throughout the world.

Events
 April 7 – Foundation of Brazilian football club Clube Náutico Capibaribe.
 May 16 – Uruguay and Argentina both play their first ever international match, when they meet in Montevideo. Argentina wins the contest (2-3).

National champions

Argentina: Alumni Athletic Club
Belgium: Racing Club de Bruxelles
England: Liverpool
France: Standard AC Meudon
Hungary: Budapest T.C. (first Hungarian League champions)
Ireland: Distillery

Italy: A.C. Milan
Netherlands: HVV Den Haag
Scotland:
Division One: Rangers
Scottish Cup: Hearts
Sweden: AIK
Switzerland: Grasshopper Zurich
Uruguay: CURCC

International tournaments
1901 British Home Championship (February 23 – March 30, 1901)

Births
 January 21 – Ricardo Zamora, Spanish international footballer
 May 24 – José Nasazzi, Uruguayan international footballer
 July 26 – Umberto Caligaris, Italian international footballer (died 1940)
 November 22 – José Leandro Andrade, Uruguayan international footballer

Clubs founded 
 FC Luzern

References 

 
Association football by year